Antônio Rogério Silva Oliveira (born 21 November 1981, in Itatira), known as Índio, is a retired Brazilian footballer.

He played domestically for Uniclinic AC, Guarany de Sobral, Ferroviário AC, EC Ipitanga, EC Vitória, América RN, Madureira and Tiradentes-CE, and spent time on loan at South Korean clubs Gyeongnam FC and Chunnam Dragons, before joining Portuguese club Beira-Mar in 2014.

Club honours

Club
Gyeongnam FC
Korean FA Cup Runner-up: 2008

External links

 

1981 births
Living people
Sportspeople from Ceará
Association football midfielders
Brazilian footballers
Brazilian expatriate footballers
Ferroviário Atlético Clube (CE) players
Ipatinga Futebol Clube players
Esporte Clube Vitória players
Gyeongnam FC players
Jeonnam Dragons players
América Futebol Clube (RN) players
Madureira Esporte Clube players
Associação Cultural e Desportiva Potiguar players
Esporte Clube Primeiro Passo Vitória da Conquista players
Esporte Clube Ypiranga players
Esporte Clube Jacuipense players
S.C. Beira-Mar players
K League 1 players
Brazilian expatriate sportspeople in South Korea
Brazilian expatriate sportspeople in Portugal
Expatriate footballers in South Korea
Expatriate footballers in Portugal